Beka Gigashvili (born 17 February 1992) is a Georgian rugby union player. His position is prop, and he currently plays for RC Toulonnais in the Top 14 and the Georgia national team.

Rugby career

In France, Gigashvili helped SO Chambéry win the Jean Prat Trophy at the conclusion of 2016–17 Fédérale 1 season. His former coach, Cyril Villain, described Gigashvili as "versatile", "hard-working", and possessing "very good scrummaging" skills. He signed with Grenoble in 2017.

References

1992 births
Living people
Rugby union players from Georgia (country)
Georgia international rugby union players
Rugby union players from Tbilisi
Rugby union props
Expatriate rugby union players from Georgia (country)
Expatriate rugby union players in France
Expatriate sportspeople from Georgia (country) in France